Freziera uniauriculata is a species of plant in the Pentaphylacaceae family. It is endemic to Bolivia.

References

Endemic flora of Bolivia
uniauriculata
Taxonomy articles created by Polbot

Vulnerable flora of South America